Four Women (Spanish:Cuatro mujeres) is a 1947 Spanish drama film directed by Antonio del Amo and starring Fosco Giachetti and María Denis.

Synopsis 
Four men playing poker at a bar table see a woman enter, and their vision reminds each of them of past love experiences.

Cast
 Matilde Artero 
 Tomás Blanco  
 Manuel de Juan 
 María Denis 
 Elda Garza
 Margarete Genske 
 Fosco Giachetti 
 Amparo Guerrero 
 Alfredo Herrero
 José Jaspe 
 Arturo Marín
 Carlos Muñoz 
 Luis Prendes 
 Emilio Ruiz de Córdoba

References

Bibliography 
 D'Lugo, Marvin. Guide to the Cinema of Spain. Greenwood Publishing, 1997.

External links 
 

1947 drama films
Spanish drama films
1947 films
1940s Spanish-language films
Films directed by Antonio del Amo
Films scored by Jesús García Leoz
Spanish black-and-white films
1940s Spanish films